The 25th Infantry Division (Hanja: 第二十五步兵師團) is Republic of Korea Army's military formation and it is one of three infantry divisions founded near the end of the Korean War. One of the regiment's reconnaissance companies from the 25th infantry division found the North Korean-made 1st infiltration tunnel on November 15, 1974.

Infantry divisions of South Korea
Military units and formations established in 1953
Yangju